Stefan Simić (born 3 January 1996) is a Serbian professional basketball player for Vršac of the Basketball League of Serbia.

External links 
 Profile at eurobasket.com

1996 births
Living people
Basketball League of Serbia players
KK Napredak Kruševac players
KK Mladost Zemun players
KK Sloboda Užice players
KK Smederevo players
KK Sutjeska players
Sportspeople from Šabac
Serbian expatriate basketball people in Montenegro
Serbian men's 3x3 basketball players
Serbian men's basketball players
Guards (basketball)